The Uglich Hydroelectric Station or Uglich GES is a hydroelectric station on the Volga River in Uglich in Yaroslavl Oblast, Russia, and is the first of the Volga-Kama Cascade of dams. It began operating on December 8, 1940, making it one of the oldest hydroelectric plants in Russia. The plant has a 120 MW capacity and is operated by RusHydro. There is also a Russian hydropower museum located at the hydroelectric plant dedicated to the development of hydropower.

History

Plant construction began in 1935 and the first excavator arrived in January 1936. The plant's design was approved on May 23, 1938 by the Economic Council of the USSR Council of People's Commissars, modeled after the Rybinsk hydroelectric station. Gulag prisoners were used in the construction. Many villages and the old part of Kalyazin were flooded by the reservoir created by the dam. Some of the oldest buildings in the region, including the 15th-century Intercession Monastery in Uglich and the 16th-century Trinity Monastery in Kalyazin, were covered by the reservoir.

The first hydroelectric generator went into operation on December 8, 1940, and the second began operating on March 20, 1941.

Upgrades
In 2007 Voith Hydro acquired a contract to replace the second hydroelectric generator at the plant, after almost 70 years of operation. The generator's operation had fallen from an initial 55 MW to 35 MW after years of deterioration. The estimated cost of the replacement was 34 million euros.  The new generator was finished in 2011 and RusHydro began modernizing the equipment of the plant's first generator in June 2011. RusHydro plans to complete the equipment replacement by 2020.

References

External links

Dams in Russia
Hydroelectric power stations built in the Soviet Union
Hydroelectric power stations in Russia
Buildings and structures in Yaroslavl Oblast
1940 establishments in the Soviet Union
Dams completed in 1940
Dams on the Volga River
Cultural heritage monuments of regional significance in Yaroslavl Oblast